1 Ceti is a star in the constellation of Cetus. With an apparent magnitude of about 6.2, the star is barely visible to the naked eye (see Bortle scale). It is moving further from the Sun with a heliocentric radial velocity of 4 km/s.

This star has a spectral type of K1III, implying a K-type giant. These types of stars are generally reddish-colored stars with spectral types from K to M, with radii that are 10 to 100 times larger than the Sun. The "CNII" in its spectral type indicates strong cyanogen signature in its outer atmosphere. The star is radiating 144 times the Sun's luminosity from its enlarged photosphere.

References

K-type giants
Cetus (constellation)
Durchmusterung objects
Ceti, 01
224481
118178
9065